Casimir William of Hesse-Homburg (23 March 1690 in Weferlingen – 9 October 1726 in Hötensleben) was a prince of Hesse-Homburg.

Life 
Casimir William was the youngest son of Landgrave Frederick II of Hesse-Homburg (1633–1708), the famous Prince of Homburg, from his second marriage with Louise Elisabeth (1646–1690), the daughter of the Duke Jacob of Courland.  He was educated together with his three years younger half-brother George Louis (from Frederick II's his third marriage with Countess Sophie Sybille of  Leiningen-Westerburg (1656–1724).  During a visit to his cousin Duke Frederick William of Mecklenburg-Schwerin the passion for hunting, which he shared with his father and his brothers, woke up in him.

Since his older brother Frederick III and his two sons preceded him in the line of succession, he opted for a military career and fought in 1708 in a Mecklenburg regiment under Prince Eugene of Savoy.  In early 1715, he entered the Swedish army under Charles XII.  Already in the early summer he was taken prisoner at Wismar and retired from the military.

In 1718, the princes of Hesse-Homburg divided some properties by drawing lots.  Casimir William drew the manor at Hötensleben.  He also owned Sinclair House opposite Homburg Castle in Bad Homburg.

His legacy is his hunting diary, which describes his passion for hunting and horses.

Marriage and issue 
He married on 9 October 1722 in Braunfels with Charlotte Christine (1690–1751), a daughter of Count William Maurice of Solms-Braunfels.  They had three children:

 Frederick IV Charles (1724–1751), ruling Landgrave of Hesse-Homburg
 married in 1746 Countess Ulrike Louise of Solms-Braunfels (1731-1792)
 Eugenie (1725-1725)
 Ulrike Sophie (1726–1792)

References 
 Wilhelm Hammann: Das Leben des Landgrafen Kasimir Wilhelm von Hessen-Homburg 1690 bis 1726, in: Jahresbericht des Grossherzoglichen Ludwig-Georgs-Gymnasiums, 1907
 Philipp Dieffenbach: Geschichte von Hessen mit besonderer Berücksichtigung des Grohßerzogthums, p. 232
 Jürgen Rainer Wolf: Landgraf Kasimir Wilhelm von Hessen-Homburg und seine vergessene Hofhaltung im Herzogtum Magdeburg, in: Aus dem Stadtarchiv. Vorträge zur Bad Hombuger Geschichte 1995/1996, Bad Homburg vor der Höhe, 1997, p. 7–27

Footnotes 

House of Hesse-Homburg
Landgraves of Hesse
1690 births
1726 deaths
18th-century German people
Sons of monarchs